János Murkovics ( Prekmurje Slovene: Janoš Murkovič, December 23, 1839 – April 15, 1917) was Slovene teacher, musician, and writer in Hungary.

He was born near Ljutomer, in Bučkovci. He studied in Germany. In 1862 he relocated to Beltinci, at that time in Hungary. In 1871 wrote the school primer Abecednik; this was the first Prekmurje Slovene book written in the Gaj's Latin alphabet.

Murkovics worked in Trbovlje from 1878 to 1880, and by 1880 was in Hungary again, in Lendava. In 1910, he retired in Lendavske Gorice, where he later died.

See also 
 List of Slovene writers and poets in Hungary

Sources 
 Zgodovina šole v Beltincih
 Pokrajinski muzej Murska Sobota, Katalog stalne razstave, Murska Sobota 1997. 
 Slovenski biografski leksikon: Murkovič Janez

Slovenian writers and poets in Hungary
Slovenian educators
1839 births
1917 deaths
People from the Municipality of Ljutomer
People from Lendava
Slovenian writers
Slovenian musicians